Donald Carl Wintersheimer (April 21, 1931 – February 18, 2021) was an American jurist who was a justice of the Kentucky Supreme Court from 1983 to 2006.

Early life and career
Wintersheimer was born April 21, 1931, in Covington, Kentucky, the son of Carl and Marie Kohl Wintersheimer. He was raised in Bellevue, Kentucky, and attended Villa Madonna College, receiving an A.B. in 1953. He served in the U.S. Army Infantry from 1953 to 1955, then went on to earn an M.A. from Xavier University in 1957 and a J.D. from the University of Cincinnati College of Law in 1960. After beginning in the private practice of law and marrying Alice Rabe, he was the solicitor for Covington for fourteen years, and became known as an advocate for consumer protection.

Judicial and later career
Wintersheimer was elected to the Kentucky Court of Appeals in 1976, and to the Kentucky Supreme Court in 1982, defeating appointed incumbent John Jay O'Hara. He won reelection in 1990 and 1998. He served from January 3, 1983 to January 1, 2007. He was a prolific opinion writer, including opinions that established the constitutional basis for the family court in Kentucky, established the constitutional basis for economic development in Kentucky, established the tort of outrage in Kentucky, and established the guidelines for open records investigations in Kentucky. He taught business law at Thomas More University before becoming an adjunct professor in constitutional law at Chase College of Law for twenty years. 

He died on February 18, 2021, in Covington.

Electoral history

References

1931 births
2021 deaths
People from Covington, Kentucky
Thomas More University alumni
Xavier University alumni
University of Cincinnati College of Law alumni
Judges of the Kentucky Court of Appeals
Justices of the Kentucky Supreme Court